Hepatocystis hipposideri is a species of parasitic protozoa. They are transmitted by flies of the genus Culicoides and infect mammals.

Taxonomy

This species was described in 1966 by Manwell and Kuntz.

Description

The schizonts  cause considerable enlargement (but not other changes) of the host cell and is often amoeboid. It usually has numerous fine pigment granules.

Distribution

This species is found in Taiwan.

Hosts

This species infects the large leafnosed bat (Hipposideros armiger terasensis).

References

Parasites of Diptera
Culicoides
Parasites of bats
Haemosporida